Memphis is an unincorporated community in Clinton County, in the U.S. state of Ohio.

History
A post office called Memphis was established in 1866, and remained in operation until 1902. By 1915, Memphis contained only a "cluster of houses".

References

Unincorporated communities in Clinton County, Ohio
Unincorporated communities in Ohio